Giuseppe Miraglia was an Italian seaplane carrier.

History

Giuseppe Miraglia was laid down in 1921 as the train ferry Città di Messina, intended for use by the Italian State Railway Company, but was acquired by the Regia Marina soon after her launch in 1923. Works to convert her into a seaplane carrier began immediately; in 1925, with the ship nearly complete, Giuseppe Miraglia capsized during a storm. Salvaged under the direction of Umberto Pugliese, she was repaired and commissioned in November 1927.

Giuseppe Miraglia participated in the Second Italo-Abyssinian War and the Spanish Civil War.

During World War II, after surviving the Battle of Taranto, she was employed in the Mediterranean theatre. After the Armistice she sailed (along with much of the Italian fleet) to Malta for internment.

After the British motor torpedo boat depot ship  was straddled by bombs and damaged beyond repair during the Luftwaffe bombing raid on the Italian port of Bari on December 2, 1943, and the subsequent mustard gas disaster, Giuseppe Miraglia was impressed by the Royal Navy as temporary replacement.

After the war Giuseppe Miraglia was used to repatriate Italian prisoners-of-war, then spent the rest of her career as a barrack ship and workshop at Taranto until her scrapping in 1950.

Aircraft facilities
Giuseppe Miraglia could carry some 17 seaplanes (originally Macchi M.18, later IMAM Ro.43) and one Reggiane 2000 "catapultabile". The ship was equipped with two catapults. Seaplanes could be retrieved by means of large doors and cranes at the sides of the hangar.

See also
 List of seaplane carriers by country

References

External links
 Nave Appoggio Aerei Giuseppe Miraglia Marina Militare website

1923 ships
Seaplane carriers of the Regia Marina
Ships built in La Spezia